Ray Copeland (July 17, 1926 – May 18, 1984) was an American jazz trumpet player and teacher.

Early life
Copeland was born in Norfolk, Virginia. He studied at Boys High School in the Bedford–Stuyvesant neighborhood of Brooklyn.

Career
Copeland's active career spanned from the 1940s to the 1980s. Throughout his career he participated on many swing and hard bop dates, appearing on the well known Monk's Music by Thelonious Monk recorded in June 1957. Copeland played with a swinging, upbeat approach, but was undoubtedly overshadowed by other top trumpeters of the era such as Lee Morgan and Clifford Brown. He toured with Thelonious Monk in 1968, and appeared at the 1973 Newport Jazz Festival. Later, Copeland was a Music Professor at Hampshire College, teaching jazz composition.

In 1974, he published the book The Ray Copeland Method and Approach to the Creative Art of Jazz Improvisation. Copeland never recorded as a session leader.

Personal life 
Copeland's son, Keith Copeland, was a noted jazz drummer. Ray died of a heart attack in 1984 in Sunderland, Massachusetts.

Discography
With Thelonious Monk
 Blue Monk, Vol. 2 (Prestige, 1954)
 Monk (Prestige, 1954)
 We See (Dreyfus, 1954)
 Monk's Music (Riverside, 1957)
 Thelonious Monk with John Coltrane (Riverside, 1957)
 Complete Live at the Five Spot 1958 with John Coltrane (1958)
With Specs Powell
Movin' In (Roulette, 1957)
With Randy Weston
 The Modern Art of Jazz by Randy Weston (Dawn, 1956)
 Little Niles (United Artists, 1958)
 Highlife (Colpix, 1963)
 Randy (Bakton, 1964) – rereleased in 1972 as African Cookbook (Atlantic)
 Monterey '66 (Verve, 1966)
 Tanjah (Polydor, 1973)
With Jimmy Witherspoon
 Goin' to Kansas City Blues (RCA Victor, 1958) with Jay McShann 
With others
 Top Brass, Ernie Wilkins (Savoy, 1955)
 Jazz Spectacular, Frankie Laine (1956)
 Look!, Lionel Hampton (1956)
 Art Blakey Big Band (Bethlehem, 1957)
 The Oscar Pettiford Orchestra in Hi-Fi Volume Two (ABC-Paramount, 1957)
 Dinah Washington Sings Fats Waller, Dinah Washington (1957)
 Sugan, Phil Woods (Status, 1957)
 Cat on a Hot Tin Horn, Cat Anderson (1958)
 Out There, Betty Carter (1958)
 Rites of Diablo, Johnny Richards (1958)
 A Map of Jimmy Cleveland,  Jimmy Cleveland (Mercury, 1959)
 Portrait of the Artist, Bob Brookmeyer (Arista, 1960)
 I Can't Help It, Betty Carter (1961)
 Listen to Art Farmer and the Orchestra, Art Farmer (Mercury, 1962)
 Manhattan Latin, Dave Pike (Decca, 1964)
 Booker 'n' Brass, Booker Ervin  (Pacific Jazz, 1967)
 Big B-A-D Band in Concert, Live 1970, Clark Terry (1970)
 Attica Blues Big Band, Archie Shepp (1979)

References

1926 births
1984 deaths
Swing trumpeters
Hard bop trumpeters
American jazz trumpeters
American male trumpeters
Musicians from Hartford, Connecticut
Hampshire College faculty
20th-century American musicians
20th-century trumpeters
Jazz musicians from Connecticut
20th-century American male musicians
American male jazz musicians